Andrzej Rewilak (born 4 September 1942 in Kraków). is a retired Polish international footballer who played as a defender. He played for Cracovia from 1960 to 1971.

He was capped for Poland only once. This was in 1966 when he played against England in a 1–1 draw.

References

1942 births
Living people
Footballers from Kraków
Polish footballers
Poland international footballers
Association football defenders
MKS Cracovia (football) players